Ewa Ziarek is the Julian Park Professor of Comparative Literature at The State University of New York at Buffalo (SUNY Buffalo). She has a major interest in engaging with other scholars on their own terms, and believes that a model of dissensus in philosophy, rather than the traditional consensus model, may produce highly valuable results.

Education and career
Ziarek received a master's degree in English from SUNY Buffalo in 1988, and her doctorate in philosophy from SUNY Buffalo in 1989. After receiving her doctorate, Ziarek accepted a position as assistant professor of English at the University of Notre Dame in 1989.  She was promoted to associate professor of English and gender studies in 1995, and to full professor of English and gender studies in 2002.  In 2003, Ziarek left Notre Dame, and in 2004 she accepted an appointment at SUNY Buffalo as the Julian Park Professor of Comparative Literature, where she remains as of 2015. In 2005 she founded the University of Buffalo Humanities Institute, which she remained the director of until 2008.

Ziarek has held a number of temporary or visiting academic positions in addition to her permanent ones. In 2005, she was a visiting scholar at the University of Tasmania, in 2007 she was a visiting scholar at Maquarie University, and since 2007 she has been a Primary Visiting Faculty Member at the Institute for Doctoral Studies in the Visual Arts at the University of Maine.  Throughout her academic career, she has also served in a variety of administrative positions, such as a five-year stint as director of graduate studies in the Department of English at the University of Notre Dame between 1994 and 1999.

Research areas
Ziarek's research brings together literary modernism, aesthetics, ethics, feminism, psychoanalysis, critical race theory, and political philosophy. Her work addresses democracy, freedom, oppression, power structures, and intersubjectivity in relation to literary modernism. Ziarek has written extensively on the idea of slavery from a feminist standpoint, challenging Giorgio Agamben's views on the subject. Ziarek believes that a model of dissensus (where scholars hold distinctly different viewpoints from each other), rather than the consensus model traditionally used in philosophy, may produce significant results.

Publications
2013: Feminist Aesthetics and the Politics of Modernism 
2001: An Ethics of Dissensus: Feminism, Postmodernity, and the Politics of Radical Democracy 
1995: The Rhetoric of Failure: Deconstruction of Skepticism, Reinvention of Modernism 

Ewa Ziarek has also edited three volumes and contributed many book chapters, as well as publishing many peer-reviewed papers on far-ranging subjects.

See also
Feminist ethics 
Modernist literature 
Narrative theory

External links
 Ewa Plonowska Ziarek Papers – Pembroke Center Archives, Brown University

References

American feminists
Living people
Year of birth missing (living people)
University at Buffalo alumni
University at Buffalo faculty